Geneva High School is a four-year comprehensive school and an institute of secondary education located in Geneva, Ohio, USA. It is a member of the Geneva Area City School District and is the largest school within the system.

History

The settlement of Geneva became an incorporated village in 1866. In 1807, the village built its first public school on Eagle Hill on the South Ridge; a one-room school built of logs.

In 1868, the village passed a tax levy and constructed a building to house the Geneva Normal School. The purpose was to address a persistent shortage of teachers for the common schools in the area. This school was not a high school. Rather, it offered normal and commercial courses along with music to prepare students for teaching. Later, it also housed public school students in the higher grades.

In 1871 the community of East Geneva built a two-room schoolhouse. The school served children in grades one through twelve. The East Geneva School District consolidated with the Geneva Area School District in 1960.

In 1872 the first Geneva students completed twelve years of education. The graduating class of 1872 had just four students. These students had attended upper grade classes at the Geneva Normal School.

It was not until 1881 that the village opened its first brick school building on the site where the old post office now stands. The school served students in grades one through eight. Plans were also in the works to build a new high school.

1884 was the year the last high school class graduated from the Geneva Normal School. There were eight graduating Seniors. Construction was nearly complete on the new high school building. The new school opened in September 1884 serving students in grades nine through twelve. It was designed for two hundred students.

Two high schools were built in Geneva in 1924: Geneva High School and East Geneva Rural School. East Geneva Rural School served students in grades seven through twelve. Geneva High School served students in grades nine through twelve. Three hundred eighty students moved into the new Geneva High School on January 7, 1925. The school, built in 1923-24, cost $290,000.

In 1937, East Geneva Rural School changed its name to Platt R. Spencer School, in honor of Platt Rogers Spencer, the originator of Spencerian penmanship.

In 1957, a brand-new high school was opened and the original Geneva High School became Geneva Junior High School. The new school was named Geneva High School. Then, in 1970, an addition was made onto the new high school, allowing the building to serve students in grades seven through twelve. Because of this, Geneva Junior High School was renamed Geneva Elementary School to serve students in grades kindergarten through six, and Spencer School became an elementary school, also to serve students in grades kindergarten through six. The high school was renamed to Geneva Junior High School and began serving students in grades seven and eight, and the new addition was named Geneva High School and began serving students in grades nine through twelve.

In 2006, another new high school was constructed, and students from the old Geneva High School in grades nine through twelve were moved into the new building for the second semester of the 2005-2006 school year. The new high school apparently experiences large leakage from the roofs when it rains. Geneva Junior High remained, though the old high school remains vacant. The board of education has converted the old high school to a middle school for grades six through eight.
Conversion for the old HS is nearing completion as is a brand new Spencer Elementary. Both projects were completed in time for the 2010-2011 school year.

Mission statement
"The Mission of Geneva High School is to nurture social skills academic excellence and values enabling students to become responsible, compassionate citizens with lifelong understandings of the arts, science, and humanities."

Notable alumni
 Edith M. Thomas, poet
 Brian Anderson, Major League Baseball pitcher

Controversy
In October 2015, student Hayden Long, along with five others, were confronted by school administrators and an officer at a homecoming dance on school property.  The administrators were claimed to have confronted the students over their belief that the students smelled like marijuana and suspended them for ten days on the spot.  The students were then taken into custody by police, where their cars were searched and they were questioned while their parents were barred from being with the students.  Hayden Long would end up committing suicide that week, but it has been concluded that the events were not the complete cause. The school and local police department faced criticisms over their actions in the aftermath of Long's death.  School administrators would defer responsibility over the incident, while the police department would claim that the officer involved in the incident was off-duty at the time and was hired by the school.

References

External links
 Geneva High School official web site
 Geneva Area City School District official web site
 Geneva High School principal Doug Wetherholt's official Twitter account

Educational institutions established in 1924
High schools in Ashtabula County, Ohio
Public high schools in Ohio
1924 establishments in Ohio
High School